Aragorn is a fictional character and a protagonist in J. R. R. Tolkien's The Lord of the Rings. Aragorn was a Ranger of the North, first introduced with the name Strider and later revealed to be the heir of Isildur, an ancient King of Arnor and Gondor. Aragorn was a confidant of the wizard Gandalf, and played a part in the quest to destroy the One Ring and defeat the Dark Lord Sauron. As a young man, Aragorn fell in love with the immortal elf Arwen, as told in The Tale of Aragorn and Arwen. Arwen's father, Elrond Half-elven, forbade them to marry unless Aragorn became King of both Arnor and Gondor. 

Aragorn led the Fellowship of the Ring following the loss of Gandalf in the Mines of Moria. When the Fellowship was broken, he tracked the hobbits Meriadoc Brandybuck and Peregrin Took with the help of Legolas the elf and Gimli the dwarf to Fangorn Forest. He then fought in the battle at Helm's Deep and the Battle of the Pelennor Fields. After defeating Sauron's forces in Gondor, he led an army of Gondor and Rohan against the Black Gate of Mordor, distracting Sauron's attention and enabling Frodo Baggins and Samwise Gamgee to destroy the One Ring. Aragorn was acclaimed as King by the people of Gondor, and crowned King of both Gondor and Arnor. He then married Arwen and ruled for 122 years.

Tolkien developed the character of Aragorn over a long period, beginning with a hobbit nicknamed Trotter and trying out many names before arriving at a Man named Aragorn. Commentators have proposed historical figures such as King Oswald of Northumbria and King Alfred the Great as sources of inspiration for Aragorn, noting parallels such as spending time in exile and raising armies to retake their kingdoms. Aragorn has been compared to the figure of Christ as King, complete with the use of prophecy paralleling the Old Testament's foretelling of the Messiah. Others have evaluated his literary status using Northrop Frye's classification, suggesting that while the hobbits are in "Low Mimetic" mode and characters such as Éomer are in "High Mimetic" mode, Aragorn reaches the level of "Romantic" hero as he is superior in ability and lifespan to those around him.

Aragorn has appeared in mainstream films by Ralph Bakshi, Rankin/Bass, and the film trilogy by Peter Jackson, and in the fan film The Hunt for Gollum. He has featured, too, in the BBC radio dramatisation of The Lord of the Rings.

Background 

Sauron, the Dark Lord, had made the One Ring, a Ring of Power, to enable him to take control of the whole of Middle-earth. Isildur and his brother Anarion – together with their father Elendil, High King of Gondor and Arnor – joined the Last Alliance of Elves (under Gil-galad) and Men against Sauron. The Alliance defeated Sauron at the Battle of Dagorlad, and laid siege to Sauron's Dark Tower, Barad-dûr, in Mordor. After seven years, Sauron came out to challenge the Alliance. During the final battle on the slopes of Mount Doom, Elendil and Gil-galad were both killed. Isildur took up the hilt-shard of Narsil, Elendil's sword, and cut the One Ring from the hand of Sauron. Despite the urging of Elrond and Círdan, Gil-galad's lieutenants, Isildur did not destroy the Ring in the fires of Mount Doom; rather, he kept the Ring for himself. The Second Age ended, and Isildur became King of both Arnor in the North and Gondor in the South. Isildur was killed by Orcs soon afterwards at the Gladden Fields beside the River Anduin, and the Ring was seemingly lost forever.

Following the defeat of Sauron and the deaths of Elendil, Anarion, and Isildur, Anarion's son, Meneldil, became king of Gondor and Isildur's son, Valandil, became king of Arnor. Many years later, the kingdom of Arnor was lost in battle with the evil land of Angmar, and Arvedui, the king of Arnor, died in a shipwreck. After that, the line of the kings of Arnor was maintained by the Chieftains of the Dúnedain, who were raised in Rivendell. The kingdom of Gondor continued, but years later, after the childless King Earnur was lost, Gondor was ruled by stewards. Eventually, Sauron returned to the land of Mordor and openly declared himself. Each Chieftain was given a name with the Kingly prefix of Ar(a)-, to signify his right to the Kingship of Arnor.

Fictional biography

Early life 

Aragorn was the son of Arathorn II and his wife Gilraen. Gilraen's mother, Ivorwen, prophesied that if Arathorn II and Gilraen "wed now, hope may be born for our people; but if they delay, it will not come while this age lasts". Aragorn was the heir to the throne of Gondor and of the lost realm of Arnor. When he was two years old, his father was killed while pursuing orcs. Aragorn was fostered in Rivendell by Elrond, who was still living in Middle-earth at the end of the Third Age. At the bidding of Elrond, his lineage was kept secret, as Elrond feared he would be killed like his father and grandfather if his true identity as Isildur's heir became known. Aragorn was renamed Estel ("hope" in Sindarin) to hide his existence from Sauron and his servants. During his childhood, he was not told about his heritage.

At the age of 20, after Aragorn had done great deeds in the company of Elrond's sons, Elrond told him of his ancestry and his true name, and gave him the shards of Elendil's sword, Narsil, and another ancient heirloom, the Ring of Barahir. He withheld the Sceptre of Annúminas from him until he had earned the right to possess it. The following day, Aragorn met and fell in love with Elrond's daughter, the beautiful elf-maiden Arwen, who had recently returned to Rivendell from her grandparents' home in Lothlorien. Thereafter, Aragorn assumed his role as the sixteenth Chieftain of the Dúnedain, also known as the Rangers of the North. He went into the wild and lived with the remnants of his people, whose kingdom (Arnor) had been destroyed centuries before. The Rangers helped to guard the Shire, a land inhabited by the diminutive hobbits. He became known as "Strider" in the areas around the Shire and Bree. Aragorn also met and befriended Gandalf the wizard. 

Aragorn undertook great journeys, serving in the armies of King Thengel of Rohan and of Ecthelion II, the Steward of Gondor. During this period, Aragorn concealed his true name and identity and was known by various aliases. His tasks helped to raise morale in the West and to counter the growing threat of Sauron and his allies, and he acquired experience that he would later put to use in the War of the Ring. With a small squadron of ships from Gondor, he led an assault on Umbar, burning many of the Corsairs' ships and personally killing their lord during the Battle of the Havens. After the victory at Umbar, he ventured alone to the east and south of Middle-earth and continued to work against Sauron.

At the age of 49, Aragorn visited Lothlórien, and there again met Arwen. He gave her the Ring of Barahir. On the hill of Cerin Amroth, Arwen pledged her hand to him in marriage, renouncing her Elvish lineage and accepting mortality (the "Gift of Men"). Elrond withheld from Aragorn permission to marry his daughter until he had become the king of both Gondor and Arnor. Arwen's choice to embrace mortality would eventually require her to be separated from her immortal father Elrond. Elrond feared that in the end, Arwen might find the prospect of death too difficult to bear.

Years later, Gandalf grew suspicious of a magic ring belonging to the hobbit Bilbo Baggins, which he later found to be Sauron's One Ring. Gandalf asked Aragorn to find Gollum, a creature who had previously possessed the Ring. This hunt led Aragorn across Rhovanion, and he finally captured Gollum in the Dead Marshes northwest of Mordor. Aragorn brought Gollum to King Thranduil's halls in Mirkwood, where Gandalf questioned him.

The War of the Ring

Aragorn met Frodo Baggins, Bilbo's adopted heir, and three of Frodo's friends at the Prancing Pony Inn in Bree. The four hobbits had set out from the Shire to bring the One Ring to Rivendell. Frodo and his friends were hoping to meet Gandalf at the Prancing Pony, but he was not there. A letter from Gandalf helped convince Frodo to trust Aragorn. Aragorn was then 87 years old, nearing the prime of life for a Númenórean. With Aragorn's help, the hobbits reached Rivendell despite being pursued by the Nazgûl, servants of Sauron.

At Rivendell, Aragorn was chosen as a member of the Fellowship of the Ring to accompany Frodo in his quest to destroy the Ring in the fires of Mount Doom in the land of Mordor. Elven-smiths reforged the shards of Narsil into a new sword, setting into the design of the blade seven stars (for Elendil) and a crescent moon (for Isildur), as well as many runes. Aragorn renamed the sword Andúril, "Flame of the West".

The Fellowship attempted to cross the Misty Mountains via the pass of Caradhras. Their attempt failed due to bad weather. Instead, the Fellowship travelled through the mines of Moria. When Gandalf was killed fighting a Balrog, Aragorn led the company to Lothlórien and down the River Anduin to the Falls of Rauros. He planned to go to Gondor to aid its people in the war against Sauron. The Fellowship was then broken: Frodo continued his journey to Mordor and was accompanied only by his gardener and friend, Samwise Gamgee. Two other hobbit members of the Fellowship, Merry and Pippin, were captured by orcs. Aragorn and two others set off to track the orcs, hoping to rescue Merry and Pippin. They learned that the orcs who kidnapped Merry and Pippin had been killed, and that no hobbits had been found among the remains. Nevertheless, clues led Aragorn to believe that the hobbits were still alive, prompting him to take the party into Fangorn Forest. They did not find the hobbits, but met Gandalf, sent back from death to continue his duties in Middle-earth. Gandalf told them that the hobbits were in the care of the Ents of Fangorn.

Together, Gandalf and the Three Hunters travelled to Edoras in Rohan, where Gandalf freed King Théoden from the enchantment of the treacherous wizard Saruman and helped him prepare the Rohirrim to fight against Saruman. Aragorn fought with the men of Rohan at the Battle of Helm's Deep, in which Saruman's army of orcs was destroyed. Aragorn used a palantír--a seeing stone--to reveal himself to Sauron as the heir of Isildur. He did this to distract Sauron's attention from Frodo, who was approaching Mordor, and to draw Sauron's forces out of Mordor. Aragorn's action caused Sauron to launch his assault on the city of Minas Tirith prematurely. To reach the city in time to defend it, Aragorn took the Paths of the Dead, summoning the Dead Men of Dunharrow. The Dead Men owed allegiance to Aragorn as the heir of Isildur; it had been prophesied by Isildur and Malbeth the Seer that the Dead would one day be summoned to pay their debt for betraying Gondor. With their aid, Aragorn defeated the Corsairs of Umbar at the port of Pelargir; Aragorn then released the Dead Men and used the Corsairs' ships to sail up the Anduin to Minas Tirith with his Rangers and a large contingent of men from the southern regions of Gondor. As they approached Minas Tirith, Aragorn unfurled the royal standard that Arwen had made for him, showing both the White Tree of Gondor and the jewelled crown and seven stars of the House of Elendil. With the help of the southern forces, the armies of Gondor and Rohan rallied and defeated Sauron's army in the Battle of the Pelennor Fields.

Aragorn's daring and success had brought him closer to his own kingship, which was his by right as a direct descendant of Isildur but had been left unclaimed for centuries by Aragorn's ancestors. Gondor had been under the rule of the Stewards of Gondor for centuries, and it was widely doubted that any of the royal line still lived. The Steward Denethor, who years before had seen Aragorn (then known as Thorongil) as a rival for his father's favour, declared that he would not bow to a descendant of Isildur. Believing that it was futile to battle Sauron, Denethor had himself burned on a funeral pyre. Aragorn healed Faramir, Denethor's heir, who had been wounded in battle and was expected to die, using the herb athelas. Faramir, unlike his father, recognized Aragorn as his lord and the rightful heir to the throne of Gondor. Aragorn's humility and self-sacrifice gained him the hearts of the inhabitants of Gondor's capital city. His healing abilities were noted by the people of Gondor; as the wise-woman and healer Ioreth said, "The hands of the King are the hands of a healer, and so shall the rightful king be known". The people hailed Aragorn as King that same evening.

Despite his immediate success and popularity, Aragorn decided to lay aside his claim to the throne for the time being. To avoid conflict, he left Minas Tirith and refused to enter it again until he was crowned King. To give Frodo the best chance of fulfilling his quest, Aragorn led an army to make a diversionary feint on the Black Gate of Mordor in the Battle of the Morannon. The army had no realistic chance of victory; the purpose of the battle was to draw Sauron's armies out of Mordor, thus aiding Frodo and Samwise as they sought to secretly journey through Mordor to destroy the Ring. Sauron attacked with overwhelming force. While the battle took place, the Ring was destroyed, and Sauron and his forces were utterly vanquished.

Upon Sauron's defeat, Aragorn was crowned as King Elessar ("Elfstone", a Quenya name given to him by Arwen's grandmother, Galadriel), and he married Arwen at midsummer. He became the twenty-sixth King of Arnor, the thirty-fifth King of Gondor, and the first High King of the Reunited Kingdom of Gondor and Arnor. His line was called the House of Telcontar (Quenya for "Strider": his name in Bree). Aragorn ruled the Kingdoms of Gondor and Arnor until year 120 of the Fourth Age. His reign was marked by great harmony and prosperity within Gondor and Arnor and by a renewal of communication and cooperation between Men, Elves, and Dwarves, fostered by his vigorous rebuilding campaign following the war. Aragorn led the forces of the Reunited Kingdom on military campaigns against some Easterlings and Haradrim, re-establishing rule over much territory that Gondor had lost in previous centuries. He died at the age of 210, after 122 years as king. The graves of the hobbits Merry and Pippin (who had died in Gondor 58 years earlier) were set beside his. He was succeeded on the throne by his son, Eldarion. Arwen, heartbroken by the loss of her husband, died shortly afterwards in Lothlórien.

Concept and creation

Identity 

The "first germ" of the character that later evolved into Aragorn or Strider was a peculiar hobbit met by Bingo Bolger-Baggins (precursor of Frodo Baggins) at the inn of The Prancing Pony. His description and behaviour, however, was already quite close to the final story, with the difference that the hobbit wore wooden shoes, and was nicknamed Trotter for the "clitter-clap" sound that they produced. He was accounted to be "one of the wild folk – rangers", and he played the same role in Frodo's journey to Rivendell as in The Lord of the Rings.

Later Tolkien hesitated about the true identity of "Trotter" for a long time. One of his notes suggested that the Rangers should not be hobbits as originally planned, and that this would mean that Trotter was either a man, or a hobbit who associated himself with the Rangers and was "very well known" (within the story). The latter suggestion was linked to an early comment of Bingo: "I keep on feeling that I have seen him somewhere before". Tolkien considered that Trotter might be Bilbo Baggins himself, but soon rejected that idea after Aragorn identified himself.

Another suggestion was that Trotter was Fosco Took (Bilbo's first cousin), who "vanished when a lad, owing to Gandalf". This story was further elaborated, making Trotter a nephew of Bilbo, named Peregrin Boffin, and an elder cousin of Frodo. He was said to have run away after he came of age, some 20 years before Bilbo left the Shire, and had helped Gandalf in tracking Gollum later. A hint was also given as to why Trotter wore wooden shoes: he had been captured by the Dark Lord in Mordor and tortured, but saved by Gandalf; a note was added by Tolkien in the margin, saying that it would later be revealed that Trotter had wooden feet.

The conception of Trotter as a hobbit was eventually discarded.  Another short-lived idea was to make Trotter "a disguised elf-friend of Bilbo's in Rivendell," and a scout from Rivendell who "pretends to be a ranger". It was not until after Book I was written that Tolkien finally settled on making Trotter a man, introducing him from the beginning as Aragorn, a "descendant of the ancient men of the North, and one of Elrond's household".

Development 

The development of Aragorn's connection to Gondor was long and complex, as was his association with Boromir. Initially, it is said that Aragorn's forefathers were the exiles of Númenor who ruled over the people of Ond (the early name of Gondor) but were driven out by the Witch-king of Angmar "when Sauron raised a rebellion". The story of the two branches of Elendil's descendants ruling over two kingdoms of Men through many generations only emerged gradually; at one time, Tolkien even seems to have conceived only three generations between Isildur and Aragorn.

Aragorn's relationship with Arwen was established very late in the writing. When Tolkien first introduced Éowyn, the interest she showed towards Aragorn was not one-sided, with suggestions in notes that they would marry at the end of the story. Another proposal was that Éowyn would die to save or avenge Théoden, and Aragorn would never marry after her death.

The first mention of Elrond's daughter, named Finduilas, was made in reference to the banner she made for Aragorn, but Tolkien did not give any hint whether she had any further part to play. The references to her marriage with Aragorn came later, but it was explicitly stated only near the completion of the book. Only in his work on the appendices for The Lord of the Rings did Tolkien record the full Tale of Aragorn and Arwen.

A passing idea was that Galadriel gave her Ring to Aragorn, and that he would accordingly be titled the "Lord of the Ring".

Names 

The original nickname "Trotter" was retained for a long time, and Tolkien decided to change it to "Strider" only after the story was completed. There were also several experimental translations of "Trotter" to Sindarin: Padathir, Du-finnion, and Rimbedir, with Ethelion possibly an equivalent of "Peregrin" (Boffin). Before the later title "the Dúnadan" ("Man of the West") emerged,  Tarkil (Quenya for "noble Man") was used, as another synonym for Númenórean.

Tolkien hesitated for some time over Strider's "real" name. Although Aragorn was the first suggestion when his Mannish descent was determined, the name was changed a number of times. At one point Tolkien decided that an Elvish name did not suit a Man, and thus altered it from Aragorn via "Elfstone" to "Ingold", an Old English name with "ing-" representing "West". Later he introduced a new plot element: Galadriel's gift of a green stone, and Tolkien reverted to Elfstone to make an additional connection.

Among other names, Tolkien considered "Elfstan", "Elfmere", "Elf-friend", "Elfspear", "Elfwold" and "Erkenbrand", with Elvish forms: Eldamir, Eldavel, Eledon, Qendemir. The name of Aragorn's father also passed through many transient forms: Tolkien paired Aramir or Celegorn with Aragorn before settling upon Arathorn; among the various pairings were "Elfhelm" and Eldakar with "Elfstone" and Eldamir; and Ingrim with "Ingold".

Significance

Conjectured historical basis 

The Catholic author Joseph Pearce and others have conjectured, without direct evidence, that Aragorn's name is derived from the Kingdom of Aragon, and leaders such as Catherine of Aragon whose heritage is linked to the crown of Castile and crown of Aragon.

The archaeologist Max Adams suggests that Tolkien may have based Aragorn on Oswald, a prince of the Northumbrian royal house exiled to the Kingdom of Dál Riata after Cadwallon King of Gwynedd and Penda King of Mercia laid waste to his ancestral homelands. Oswald returned years later with a raised army of Anglian exiles and retook his kingdom, slaying Cadwallon in the process.

The French medievalist Alban Gautier, and separately the historian Christopher Snyder, suggest a connection with a different Anglo-Saxon king, Alfred of Wessex, described by Snyder as "an unexpected monarch (he had four elder brothers) and inspirational leader who united disparate peoples". The Dutch medievalist Thijs Porck writes that Alfred, like Aragorn, spent time in exile. Danes attacked him in Chippenham, and he took refuge in the wilds before gathering an army at Egbert's Stone and defeating the Danes at the Battle of Edington. Alfred's history parallels Aragorn's gathering of the Dead, the Oathbreakers, at the Stone of Erech.

The fragmentation of the Dúnedain kingdoms, leading to Aragorn's small band of Rangers living in the wild, has been compared to that of the early Frankish kingdoms.

Christ-figure 

Aragorn has been called a Christ-as-King character; Tolkien's use of prophecy has been compared to the Old Testament's foretelling of the coming of the Messiah. It has been suggested that some of the Christian themes extrapolated from Tolkien's work were not intentional, but resulted from the interplay between the background he grew up in and the myths that inspired him. However, aspects of Aragorn's character - his ability to heal, his sacrificial journey, and his experiences with death and the dead - have long been seen as clues to overt Messianic overtones.

Karen Nikakis writes that Aragorn fits a "sacrificial king" archetype, noting the multiple sacrifices that Aragorn makes for the benefit of those around him and for his future people. Those sacrifices include waiting to claim his throne and to marry Arwen until the One Ring had been destroyed.

Romantic hero 

The Tolkien scholar Tom Shippey evaluates the literary status of Aragorn and The Lord of the Rings using Northrop Frye's Anatomy of Criticism. He writes that figures like Éomer of Rohan and Faramir of Gondor are, in Frye's terms, "superior in degree to other men but not to their natural environment", which places them in Frye's "High Mimetic" literary mode. The hobbits are often in "Low Mimetic" mode, or even (like Bilbo) "Ironic". Aragorn, Shippey states, while not being a "Mythic" figure, is superior to his environment; Shippey points out that he can run 135 miles in three days and lives "in full vigour" for over 200 years. This places him in Frye's "Romantic" mode. Tolkien does come close to myth, Shippey suggests, when Gandalf confronts the leader of the Nazgûl at the gate of Minas Tirith and a cock crows "as if" signalling the arrival of the Rohan cavalry, just as a crowing cock signalled the Resurrection to Simon Peter in the Bible.

The Tolkien scholar Verlyn Flieger contrasts the warrior-hero Aragorn with the suffering hero Frodo Baggins. Aragorn is, like Beowulf, an epic/romance hero, a bold leader and a healer-king. Frodo is "the little man of fairy tale", the little brother who unexpectedly turns out to be brave. But the fairy tale happy ending comes to Aragorn, marrying the beautiful princess (Arwen) and winning the kingdom (Gondor and Arnor); while Frodo, who returns home miserable, with neither Ring nor appreciation by the people of the Shire, gets "defeat and disillusionment—the stark, bitter ending typical of the Iliad, Beowulf, the Morte D'Arthur". In other words, the two types of hero are not only contrasted, but combined, halves of their legends swapped over. Flieger comments that the two together mark the end of the old, with Frodo's bitter end and the disappearance of the Ring, the Elves, and much else that was beautiful; and the start of the new, with Aragorn's rise to the throne of Gondor and Arnor, and a world of Men.

Adaptations

Film 

Aragorn was voiced by John Hurt in Ralph Bakshi's 1978 animated film version of The Lord of the Rings, and by Theodore Bikel in the 1980 Rankin/Bass animated version of The Return of the King, made for television. Kari Väänänen portrayed him in the 1993 Finnish television miniseries Hobitit.

In Peter Jackson's the Lord of the Rings film trilogy, Aragorn was played by the Danish-American actor Viggo Mortensen. He received acclaim for the portrayal, and Aragorn was ranked No. 15 in Empires 2015 survey of greatest film characters.

Fan film responses 

In the 2009 fan film The Hunt for Gollum, Aragorn is portrayed by Adrian Webster. The film is set during the time of The Fellowship of the Ring. It takes place after Gandalf has discovered the true nature of Bilbo's ring and just before Frodo leaves the Shire for Rivendell. Another fan film, Kate Madison's 2009 Born of Hope, imagines a time in the life of Aragorn's parents from shortly before they are married to his father's early death. 

The film scholar Maria Alberto writes that such fan films reveal one way that readers engage with Tolkien's writings. In her view, Born of Hope, six years in the making, comes close to a canonical narrative, while Hunt for Gollum expands a canonical incident. Alberto notes, too, that Born of Hope nods to Mortensen's physical appearance as Aragorn in both casting and costume. As for Hunt for Gollum, Alberto writes, the narrative arc requires the viewer to know from the Lord of the Rings why Aragorn would be searching for Gollum, while his meeting Gandalf in a pub plainly recalls "both Tolkien's and Jackson's" Prancing Pony. Alberto states that the widely-scattered locations, from north Wales to Epping Forest and Hampstead Heath are meant to be seen as a measure of how far Aragorn travels, and in which part of the world, as he seeks Gollum. She cites the scholar Robin Anne Reid's remark that "Hunt is 'imitative' where Hope is transformative", meaning that the former attempts to mimic Jackson and Tolkien, whereas the latter sees fans interpreting and adding to the canon.

Other 

In Brian Sibley's 1981 BBC radio dramatisation of The Lord of the Rings, Aragorn was played by Robert Stephens. Sibley writes that Stephens gave "a mercurial performance, combining nobility and humanity in his portrayal of the returning king whose fate, along with that of all Middle-earth, [hung] on the success or failure of Frodo's quest." 
On stage, Aragorn was portrayed by Evan Buliung in the three-hour production of The Lord of the Rings, which opened in 2006 in Toronto, Ontario, Canada. 
In the 1969 parody Bored of the Rings, Aragorn is portrayed as "Arrowroot son of Arrowshirt".

References

Primary 

This list identifies each item's location in Tolkien's writings.

Secondary

Sources 

 
 
 
 
 
 
 
 
 
 
 
 

Adventure film characters
Christ figures in fiction
Fictional kings
Fictional war veterans
Literary characters introduced in 1954
The Lord of the Rings characters
Middle-earth rulers
Middle-earth Dúnedain